Erma Knoll is a 412m peak in upper Huron Glacier, Livingston Island.  The peak was first visited on 17 December 2004 by the Bulgarian Lyubomir Ivanov from Camp Academia, and was mapped by Bulgaria in 2005 and 2009 from the Tangra 2004/05 topographic survey.  The knoll is named after Erma River in western Bulgaria.

Location

Maps
 L.L. Ivanov et al. Antarctica: Livingston Island and Greenwich Island, South Shetland Islands. Scale 1:100000 topographic map. Sofia: Antarctic Place-names Commission of Bulgaria, 2005.
 L.L. Ivanov. Antarctica: Livingston Island and Greenwich, Robert, Snow and Smith Islands. Scale 1:120000 topographic map.  Troyan: Manfred Wörner Foundation, 2009.

References
 Erma Knoll. SCAR Composite Antarctic Gazetteer
 Bulgarian Antarctic Gazetteer. Antarctic Place-names Commission. (details in Bulgarian, basic data in English)

External links
 Erma Knoll. Copernix satellite image

Hills of Livingston Island